The Grand Hotel is located at 1232–1238 Broadway at the corner of West 31st Street in the NoMad neighborhood of Manhattan, New York City.

History 
It was built in 1868 and was designed by Henry Engelbert in the Second Empire style. Englebert designed the hotel for Elias S. Higgins, a prosperous carpet manufacturer and merchant.

At the time the Grand Hotel was built, the area of Broadway between Madison Square and Herald Square was the premier entertainment district in the city, teeming with theatres, restaurants and hotels. The sleazier establishments on the side streets soon gave the district a new name, the "Tenderloin". When the theatre district moved uptown again, the area became part of the Garment District, and the Grand Hotel became a cut-rate residential hotel.

Oscar Wilde is known to have stayed at the hotel at least twice during 1882. 

The building was designated a New York City Landmark in 1979, and was added to the National Register of Historic Places in 1983.

See also
National Register of Historic Places listings in Manhattan from 14th to 59th Streets
 List of former hotels in Manhattan
List of New York City Designated Landmarks in Manhattan from 14th to 59th Streets

References
Notes

External links

Hotel buildings on the National Register of Historic Places in Manhattan
Second Empire architecture in New York City
Hotel buildings completed in 1868
Defunct hotels in Manhattan
New York City Designated Landmarks in Manhattan
Henry Engelbert buildings
Broadway (Manhattan)
1868 establishments in New York (state)
Manger hotels